1/42 is the only live recorded album for the Japanese band Mr.Children, released as a limited edition with 500,000 units in September 1999.

Its title was derived from the number of the places where the band played on that year's their concert tour entitled Discovery. All tracks were adopted from the live performance at the Makomanai Ice Arena, recorded on July 26, 1999, except for the additional track "Dakishimetai" that was recorded in the gig at the Okinawa Ginowan Seaside Park.

The double album debuted at the position of #1 on the Japanese Oricon albums chart and sold out 7 weeks later from its release. Finally the album was certified RIAJ double-platinum status, selling estimated more than 500,000 copies.

Track listing
All songs written and composed by Kazutoshi Sakurai

Disc one
 "Discovery" 
 "Undershirt" 
 
 "Prism" 
 "Everything (It's you)"
 "I'll be" 
 " -Mémento-Mori-"
 "Simple"

Disc two
"Love Connection" 
"Dance Dance Dance" 
""
"La La La" 
"Tomorrow never knows" 
""
""
"innocent world"  
"Image" 
"" [Bonus Track]

Charts and certification

References

Mr. Children live albums
1999 live albums
Japanese-language live albums
Toy's Factory live albums